Huracán Valencia Club de Fútbol was a Spanish football team based in Torrent, in the Valencian Community. Founded in 2011, it played in Segunda División B until 2016, when it was dissolved.

History
Huracán Valencia Club de Fútbol was founded in June 2011. A few days later, the club bought Torrellano Illice CF's place in Tercera División. Subsequently, on 18 July, it purchased a vacant place in Segunda División B, moving up another category without having played one single match.

In 2014, after playing three seasons in the Polideportivo Municipal of Manises, the club moved to Torrent and played its games in the Estadio San Gregorio.

On 30 December 2015, Huracán Valencia was expelled from the competition due to debts with referees. The following month, the club officially folded.

After the club's dissolution, a fusion with FBM Moncada CF followed and a new team was formed, called CF Huracán Moncada and based in Moncada.

Season to season

5 seasons in Segunda División B

Managers
 Óscar Fernández (2011)
 Nico Estévez (2011–2013)
 Iñaki Alonso (2013–2014)
 Émerson Esteve (2014)
 Toni Seligrat (2014–2015)
 Raúl Garrido (2015–2016)

References

External links
Official website 
Futbolme team profile 
Fansite 

 
2011 establishments in the Valencian Community
2016 disestablishments in the Valencian Community
Association football clubs established in 2011
Association football clubs disestablished in 2016
Defunct football clubs in the Valencian Community
Football clubs in Valencia